Mount Hague is in the Beartooth Mountains in the U.S. state of Montana. The peak is one of the tallest in the Beartooth Mountains and is in the Absaroka-Beartooth Wilderness of Custer National Forest.

References

Hague
Beartooth Mountains